Frederic Pooda (born 16 April 1988) is an Ivorian professional football midfielder who plays for Bangladesh Police FC in the Bangladesh Premier League. He is one of the top scorers of Bangladesh Police FC.

External links
 goal.com
 
 

1988 births
Association football midfielders
Ivorian footballers
People from Sassandra-Marahoué District
Living people
Séwé Sport de San-Pédro players
Stade d'Abidjan players
Frederic Pooda
Lao Toyota F.C. players
Sime Darby F.C. players
PDRM FA players
Hanthawaddy United F.C. players
Ivorian expatriate footballers
Ivorian expatriate sportspeople in Thailand
Ivorian expatriate sportspeople in Malaysia
Ivorian expatriate sportspeople in Myanmar
Ivorian expatriate sportspeople in Laos
Expatriate footballers in Thailand
Expatriate footballers in Malaysia
Expatriate footballers in Myanmar
Expatriate footballers in Laos